Diego Hidalgo and Martin Redlicki were the defending champions but chose not to defend their title.

Liam Draxl and Stefan Kozlov won the title after defeating Alex Rybakov and Reese Stalder 6–2, 6–7(5–7), [10–7] in the final.

Seeds

Draw

References

External links
 Main draw

Kentucky Bank Tennis Championships - Doubles
2021 Doubles